Robert Michael Amick (Born April 3, 1995) is an American soccer player.

Career

Amateur & College
Amick spent four years playing college soccer at the University of California, Los Angeles between 2013 and 2016, where he appeared in 73 games for the Bruins, tallying 1 goal and captaining the team for three years

Amick also appeared for USL PDL sides OC Pateadores Blues and FC Golden State Force.

Professional
After being drafted by the Portland Timbers with the overall 32nd pick (2nd Round: 10th pick), he debuted for the Timbers 2 against the Tulsa Roughnecks in the USL. He started 11 games and made 15 appearances during his rookie season.

References

External links

https://uclabruins.com/sports/mens-soccer/roster/michael-amick/4794

1995 births
Living people
American soccer players
Association football defenders
FC Golden State Force players
OC Pateadores Blues players
Soccer players from California
Sportspeople from Sunnyvale, California
UCLA Bruins men's soccer players
USL Championship players
USL League Two players
De Anza Force players